Freddi Fish and the Case of the Missing Kelp Seeds is a video game developed and published by Humongous Entertainment and the first game released for the Freddi Fish franchise. It was released on October 28, 1994. In 2008, it was released on the Wii under the title Freddi Fish in Kelp Seed Mystery as well as Windows and Macintosh, and on Android with a shortened title Freddi Fish and the Missing Kelp Seeds. The Wii version's availability was limited by legal problems concerning its development. A simplified handheld LCD game partially based on Kelp Seeds was also released in 1999 that adapted one of its minigames, Jellyfish Jamboree and was titled Freddi Fish: Jellyfish Jamboree.

Plot
Sam, a pelican, delivers flowers to Freddi Fish to give to Snappy Turtle (or Jason the guppy), and Grandma Grouper. When Freddi arrives at Grandma Grouper's house, she finds out that the latter's treasure chest that holds all the kelp seeds (the source of the ocean's food) has been taken. As such, her garden has begun to wilt, which will cause all the fish to starve if the kelp seeds aren't found. A courageous Freddi offers to find the treasure and Grandma Grouper gives Freddi her last "peanut butter and jellyfish" sandwich for her journey.

Freddi finds her friend, Luther, trying to swim loop-de-loops, eventually knocking a bottle loose. When Freddi and Luther investigate, they see a note lodged inside. The note gives them a clue to where the treasure is, and they look for more clues. Unbeknownst to them, it was two sharks, Boss and Spongehead, who were the ones that stole the treasure as part of their plan to help their boss, the Squidfather, grow kelp. Spongehead had hidden four bottles with notes in them in random locations so he could find his way back to the treasure. 

As Freddi and Luther find more of Spongehead's clues to the treasure, Boss becomes increasingly furious at Spongehead for not remembering where the treasure is or the bottles that lead the way, so he takes him to the Squidfather as punishment. Upon finding out, the Squidfather is enraged and spews out ink. Out of fear, Spongehead remembers where the treasure is and the sharks go retrieve it right after Freddi and Luther have found the last bottle, revealing that the treasure is at a sunken ship.

At the sunken ship, Freddi and Luther open a window on the ship (after receiving a crank handle from the pirate, Phineas McFinn) and spot the treasure, but the two are stopped by Boss and Spongehead, who order them to hand it over. Freddi boldly refuses and explains that everyone can grow kelp if they share it, which the sharks agree on. While the sharks go to tell the Squidfather about their deal, Freddi and Luther grab the treasure, spread it around to give to everyone, and plant it in Grandma Grouper's Garden. As Luther tries to take most of the credit for retrieving the treasure, Grandma Grouper invites the two into her home so they can tell her all about their adventure.

Gameplay
The game makes use of a simplified adventure system where a single click on a certain spot allows the player to pick up items, go to another location, talk to characters and find trivial but fun stuff in the screen. Clicking on an item in the right place allows Freddi to make use of it. Most puzzles require the player to make exchanges with characters and use items to get to inaccessible areas. The locations of the clues in bottles and the trails to follow for the treasure chest are randomized in every new game.

There are also a few minigames, such as "Jellyfish Jamboree", where Freddi must fend off waves of jellyfish by throwing food at them before they get too close, with Luther keeping score. Such minigame forms the basis of the LCD handheld version.

Reception
Freddi Fish and the Case of the Missing Kelp Seeds received mixed reviews from various critics. GameRankings lists a 60% score for the Windows version based on 1 review, Metacritic has an average score of 70 out 100, Allgame gave a 4-star rating, GameZone rated 7 out of 10, Adventure Gamers gave a 3-star rating, and Unikgamer gave a 7 out 10 score. It also received over 20 awards.

The Case of the Missing Kelp Seeds won Electronic Entertainments 1994 "Best Edutainment Title" award. The editors wrote that the game features a well made original characters, strong storyline, appropriately challenging puzzles, and beautiful animation.

The Case of the Missing Kelp Seeds was a commercial success, with sales of 250,000 units by 1999. During the year 2001 alone, Freddi Fish sold 54,447 retail units in North America, according to PC Data.

References

External links
 
 Freddi Fish and the Missing Kelp Seeds at Humongous Entertainment

1994 video games
Atari games
Detective video games
Humongous Entertainment games
Adventure games
Android (operating system) games
IOS games
Linux games
Classic Mac OS games
ScummVM-supported games
Video games featuring female protagonists
Wii games
Windows games
Point-and-click adventure games
Video games scored by George Sanger
Video games developed in the United States
Single-player video games
Majesco Entertainment games
Children's educational video games
Video games with underwater settings
Children's games
Tommo games